Shinatsuhiko (Kojiki: 志那都比古神 - Long Blowing Lad, Nihon Shoki: 級長津彦命) is a Japanese mythological god of wind (Fūjin). Another name for this deity is Shinatobe, who originally may have been a separate goddess of wind.

The Nihon Shoki stated that Shinatsuhiko was born after Izanagi no Mikoto and Izanami no Mikoto created the great eight islands of Japan. After these lands were completed, Izanagi blew at the morning mists that obscured them and these became Shinatsuhiko, God of the Wind. A Shinto liturgical text or ritual incantation called norito addressed the god in this masculine name while a different name - Shinatobe - was ascribed to what is presumed to be his feminine version. Some sources also called the wind deities Ame no Mihashira (pillar of Heaven) and Kuni no Mihashira (pillar of the Earth/Country) according to the belief that the wind supported the sky. It is noted that these names preceded Shinatsuhiko and Shinatobe.

References

External links
Shinatsuhiko on the Japanese History Database.

Japanese gods
Wind deities
Shinto kami
Kunitsukami